XMLNuke is an open source framework intended to create Websites using only XML/XSLT transformations. XMLNuke has several classes to aid the developer create entire applications producing only XML. XMLNuke is integrated with a basic Content management system.

Design

XMLNuke assumes it the most important part of any site is the information. However all information is merged with complex HTML, JavaScript structures, so any changes in the application or design may cause a very deep modification in the current structure. Using XMLNuke you can separate naturally your information from your layout. Any class in XMLNuke produces XML.

You can easily move your site from a FLAT layout to a very complex layout using, for example, Ajax, without any change in your application.

XMLNuke focus the development to maintenance.

References

External links

XML software